Jenny's Lantern is an area of moorland in north Northumberland, England, taking its name from an 18th-century 'eye-catcher' folly sited towards the top of a small promontory hill above the River Aln. Situated on the southern slope of the Jenny's Lantern area is an Iron Age hillfort, overbuilt by and adjoined to a larger and very well preserved Romano-British stone-built settlement and field system. It partially collapsed during a storm in November 2021.

Location and naming
The site is immediately south of the boundary of Bewick and Beanley Moors SSSI.

Jenny's Lantern, or Jenny of the Lantern, is the reputed Northumbrian name for Will-o'-the-wisp, a form of atmospheric ghost lights associated with leading travellers to dangerous places. A legend ascribed to this Jenny's Lantern tells of a shepherd who, one night, is drowned in a bog whilst following a lantern lit by his wife Jenny to guide his return from the inn at Eglingham.

Folly
An 18th-century folly, presumably built by the Bolton estate, is sited towards the top of the Jenny's Lantern area; it takes the form of a ruined shepherd's cottage, rectangular in plan with door and windows on the south wall, a complete westerly wall, but stepped and ruined towards the east wall. The local penchant for follies extended to the dominant landowner, Hugh Percy, 1st Duke of Northumberland who commissioned the Ratcheugh Observatory before 1770, and whose 1781 Brizlee Tower sits roughly opposite, across the Aln, from Jenny's Lantern.

During a severe storm on the night of 27 November 2021, the folly partially collapsed.

Hillfort

Jenny's Lantern hillfort is an Iron Age defended settlement, undated, but falling within a style dating from circa 700BCE to 100CE.

Romano-British settlement
The Jenny's Lantern hillfort, and the area to its east, preserve the remains of a supposed Romano-British settlement. A field system delineated by rubble and boulder boundaries is found to the south and east of the enclosures. A lacrymatory was discovered at the site in 1824, and a quern-stone in 1885. Historic England note that the "Iron Age defended settlement, Romano-British settlement and its field system south and east of Jenny's Lantern are extensive and particularly fine examples of their types" and note that survival of Romano-British field systems is rare, making the Jenny's Lantern site especially valuable.

The hillfort and settlement site has been placed on the Heritage at Risk Register, as its condition is found to be "generally unsatisfactory with major localised problems"; bracken is identified as the principal cause of vulnerability.

References

Folly buildings in England
Hill forts in Northumberland
Roman sites in Northumberland